Brigadier-General Sir Wyndham Henry Deedes, CMG, DSO(10 March 1883 – 2 September 1956) was a British Army officer and civil administrator. He was the Chief Secretary to the British High Commissioner of the British Mandate of Palestine.

Early life 
Deedes was born on 10 March 1883 in Kent, England. He was the youngest son of East Kent gentry, Colonel Herbert George Deedes and Rose Elinor Barrow, whose family had owned the land between Hythe and Ashford for four centuries.

He was educated at Eton College, an all-boys public boarding school in Eton, Berkshire.

Military career
On 4 February 1901, Deedes was commissioned into the 9th Battalion, King's Royal Rifle Corps as a second lieutenant. He was posted to South Africa where he fought in the Second Boer War. On 22 January 1906, Deedes was promoted to lieutenant and seconded to the Colonial Office. During this time he learned Turkish. By 1910 he had enough of a command of the language to satisfy a posting to Constantinople. On 8 May 1910, Deedes was seconded for service under the Foreign Office. While still a part of the British military he undertook the responsibility to reform the Ottoman Gendermarie force from 1910 till the start of the World War I, he was an influential figure in Ottoman Interior Ministry.

During World War I, Deedes saw service in Gallipoli, where he took part in the Gallipoli Campaign. On 27 April 1915, the then Captain Deedes was appointed as a General Staff Officer (2nd Class). Deedes was promoted to Major on 14 September 1916. On 1 January 1916, he was appointed Companion of the Distinguished Service Order (DSO) "for distinguished service in the field". In October 1916, he was awarded the Order of the White Eagle, 4th Class (with Swords) by King Peter I of Serbia. On 21 March 1917, Deedes was promoted to temporary Lieutenant Colonel upon appointment as a General Staff Officer (1st Class) in the General Staff. On 3 June 1917, Deedes was awarded the rank of Brevet Colonel "for distinguished service in the field". During the war, he was honoured by the French Republic with the appointment to the Legion of Honour as a Chevalier.

After the war he was posted to Istanbul, Turkey, as a military attaché. He was posted to Cairo, Egypt, which was at that time a British protectorate, as public security director. Here he helped to set up the Palestine Police Force.

From 1920 to 1922, Deedes served as Chief Secretary to the then British High Commissioner Sir Herbert Samuel in Palestine. Palestine was then under British mandate following the League of Nations decision in 1920 to hand it over to British control from 1923 onwards. Although Deedes had pro-Zionist sympathies, he played a role in promoting the Supreme Muslim Council as an Arab counterweight to the Jewish Agency. 
He retired from the British Army on 27 June 1923, with the honorary rank of Brigadier General. There is a street named after him in the Emek Refaim neighborhood of Jerusalem, Israel.

Later life
Upon returning to England, Deedes did not take up his heritage as a country squire, but moved to London and chose to do unpaid social work in one of the poorest quarters of the city.

Between 1931 and the end of World War II in 1945, he shared a house in Bethnal Green with his nephew William Deedes. During this time he became a local councillor, served on the education committee and became chairman of the London Council of Social Service. He was also vice chairman of the National Council of Social Services.

When the London Turkish House (Halkevi) was set up during World War II to help foster Anglo-Turkish relations, Deedes was its chairman, with Lady Dorina Neave in charge of its social side. During the War, Deedes also became chief Air Raid Warden of his borough.

In 1946, severe illness forced him to retire from his work in the London East End. He returned to Hythe to live his years in a single room. In 1949, one year after the state of Israel was formed, he set up the Anglo-Israel Association. He died in 1956.

Personal life 
Deedes was a strict Christian. He never married nor had any children. His older brother, Herbert William Deedes (born 27 October 1881), married Melesina Gladys Chenevix Trench on 3 July 1912. They had three children, with one of whom, William Deedes, he shared a home from 1931 to 1939.

Translations 
Deedes translated three major Turkish literary works into English: two novels by Reşat Nuri Güntekin and a memoir by Mahmut Makal:

 Reşat Nuri Güntekin. The Autobiography of a Turkish Girl (Çalıkuşu, 1922). London: George Allen & Unwin, 1949.
 Reşat Nuri Güntekin. Afternoon Sun (Akşam Güneşi, 1926). London: Heinemann, 1951.
 Mahmut Makal. A Village in Anatolia (Bizim Köy, 1950). London: Vallentine, Mitchell & Co., 1954.

References

External links

 Bio at eastlondonhistory.com
 Bio at answers.com

1883 births
1956 deaths
Chief Secretaries of Palestine
British Army brigadiers
English social workers
English translators
People from Kent
Members of London County Council
Members of Bethnal Green Metropolitan Borough Council
People educated at Eton College
King's Royal Rifle Corps officers
Companions of the Distinguished Service Order
Companions of the Order of St Michael and St George
British Army personnel of World War I
20th-century British translators
Civil Defence Service personnel
Military personnel from Kent
British military attachés
Knights Bachelor